WKDV is a Regional Mexican formatted broadcast radio station licensed to Manassas, Virginia, serving Northern Virginia.  WKDV is owned and operated by Metro Radio, Inc.

The station has been silent since December 2020, when the 11-acre site in Manassas which had hosted the broadcast towers since the 1960s was sold.

Former format
In the 1990s, the station was a Radio AAHS affiliate, which played children's music.

Translator
In addition to the main station, WKDV is relayed by two FM translators to widen its broadcast area.

References

External links
Metro Radio's website

1957 establishments in Virginia
Spanish-language radio stations in the United States
Radio stations established in 1957
KDV